The Zal Mahmud Pasha Mosque is a 16th-century Ottoman mosque located in the Eyüp district of Istanbul, Turkey. It was designed by the imperial architect Mimar Sinan and completed in 1590.

History
The building of the mosque was jointly endowed by Şah Sultan and her second husband, the Bosnian born vizier, Zal Mahmud Pasha. Both had died in 1580. Şah was one of the daughters of the sultan Selim II and his wife Nurbanu Sultan. After the death of Şah Sultan's first husband in 1574 she married Zal Mahmud Pasha who in 1553 under Suleiman I's orders had strangled Şehzade Mustafa, a half-brother of Selim II and Suleiman's eldest son.

The mosque was designed by the imperial architect Mimar Sinan. Building work began in 1577 but was not completed until 1590, two years after Sinan's death.

Architecture
The mihrab is surrounded by a border of Iznik tiles.

Gallery

See also
List of Friday mosques designed by Mimar Sinan

References

Sources

External links

Zal Mahmud Paşa Külliyesi, Archnet
 Photographs of the Zal Mahmud Pasha Mosque by Dick Osseman

Religious buildings and structures completed in 1577
Mimar Sinan buildings
Ottoman mosques in Istanbul
Eyüp
16th-century mosques